Tactical Ops: Assault on Terror is an online multiplayer video game.

Publication history
Though it started as a mod for Unreal Tournament in December 1999, it soon became available as a retail version, which was released in April 2002 in the United States by Infogrames, who released it under the MicroProse brand name. The retail version is a standalone which does not require Unreal Tournament and contains additional maps not found in the free download.

The game was developed by Kamehan Studios, the last version being 3.4.0.

In 2004, fans of the game got permission from Atari to create a patch. This version (3.5.0) was released on March 16, 2005.

Reviews
PC Games (Germany)
4Players.de
Game Vortex
GameZone
Gamesmania.de
GameSpot (Belgium/Netherlands)
Absolute Games (AG.ru)
Playback
Fragland.net
GameSpy
Jeuxvideo.com
PC Team
The Armchair Empire
PC Gamer
GameSpot
IGN
Gameguru Mania
ActionTrip
Electric Playground
UOL Jogos

See also 
 List of video games derived from modifications

References 

1999 video games
2002 video games
Infogrames games
Multiplayer online games
Windows games
Windows-only games
Unreal Engine games
Video game mods
Video games about police officers
Video games developed in France
Unreal (video game series) mods
Tactical shooter video games